Wilf Hall (14 October 1934 – August 2007) was a footballer who played in the Football League for Ipswich Town and Stoke City.

Career
Hall was born in Haydock, St. Helens and played football with Earlestown F.C. in the Lancashire Combination. He impressed scouts from Football League side Stoke City and he joined them for a small fee. He made his debut during Stoke's epic FA Cup third round tie against Bury. He played in all five matches against the "Shakers" in what is the longest cup match between two professional sides, in total it took 9 hours and 22 minutes before Stoke finally won.

During this time at Stoke Hall was used as back up to first choice Bill Robertson and only had a sustained run in the side in the 1957–58 season. He joined Ipswich Town in 1960 where he was again second choice this time to Roy Bailey. He left Ipswich in 1963 and went on to play for Macclesfield Town.

Career statistics
Source:

Honours
 Ipswich Town
 Football League Second Division champions: 1960–61

References

External links
 

English footballers
Stoke City F.C. players
Ipswich Town F.C. players
English Football League players
1934 births
2007 deaths
Macclesfield Town F.C. players
Altrincham F.C. players
Association football goalkeepers
Earlestown F.C. players